Cryptoblepharus xenikos is a species of lizard in the family Scincidae. The species is endemic to Papua New Guinea.

Habitat
The preferred natural habitat of C. xenikos is savanna.

Reproduction
C. xenikos is oviparous.

References

Further reading
Cogger HG (2014). Reptiles and Amphibians of Australia, Seventh Edition. Clayton, Victoria, Australia: CSIRO Publishing. xxx + 1,033 pp. .
Horner P (2007). "Systematics of the snake-eyed skinks, Cryptoblepharus Wiegmann (Reptilia: Squamata: Scincidae) – an Australian-based review". The Beagle Supplement 3: 21–198. (Cryptoblepharos xenikos, new species).
Wilson, Steve; Swan, Gerry (2013). A Complete Guide to Reptiles of Australia, Fourth Edition. Sydney: New Holland Publishers. 522 pp. .

Cryptoblepharus
Reptiles of Papua New Guinea
Endemic fauna of Papua New Guinea
Reptiles described in 2007
Taxa named by Paul Horner (herpetologist)
Skinks of New Guinea